Storie scellerate, internationally released as Bawdy Tales, is a 1973 Italian comedy film directed by Sergio Citti.

Plot 
The film is set in 1800, in Rome. Two thieves are imprisoned and condemned to death. To pass the time, the two tell ribald stories: in the first a duke and a man named Nicolino discover that their wives have betrayed them with the boys and with a priest; in the second story two farmers are fighting a clappers asimile Rustican Cavalry by Giovanni Verga, because their wife has betrayed both. In the third story a priest lover of beautiful women kills one of his pilgrims, because he is in love with one of the girls of his menagerie; in the last story a husband sells all of his money to gain his wife's affection. He tells her that since he is now broke he intends to kill himself. The wife has a different plan to take on an elderly man who has been making eyes at her in public as a live-in john. The husband accepts and all three live together as a happy family. The wife soon becomes bored of the two and takes a much younger lover with whom she meets frequently in a meadow outside of town. The elderly man informs the husband of this and the two ambush and kill the young man. Soon the wife dies of heart break and the husband and john are executed for their crime. It is now Judgment Day and the archangel is listing all their crimes before the Lord and asking all of them how they plead. The two husbands and the wife give self-serving answers about how they wish to go to Paradise and serve the Lord whom they have always cherished while the young man says he would prefer to go back to Earth so he can screw around and get drunk like in the old times. The angel banishes the three to Hell but sends the young lover to Paradise. The two thieves now have the nooses around their throats and are laughing, almost in tears at the funny ending to the story. They are executed and the film ends on a shot of them hanging lifeless from the nooses.

Cast 
 Franco Citti: Mammone 
 Ninetto Davoli: Bernardino 
 Nicoletta Machiavelli: Caterina di Ronciglione 
 Silvano Gatti: Duca di Ronciglione 
 Enzo Petriglia: Nicolino  
 Santino Citti: Il Padreterno 
 Giacomo Rizzo: Don Leopoldo 
 Gianni Rizzo: Il cardinale

References

External links

1973 films
Italian comedy films
1973 comedy films
Films directed by Sergio Citti
Films produced by Alberto Grimaldi
Films scored by Francesco De Masi
1970s Italian-language films
1970s Italian films